Exin is a cargo airline based in Lublin, Poland. Its main base is Katowice International Airport.

Destinations
Exin operates the following services on behalf of DHL Aviation (as of February 2010):

Denmark
Copenhagen - Copenhagen Airport

Estonia
Tallinn - Lennart Meri Tallinn Airport

Finland
Helsinki - Helsinki-Vantaa Airport

France
Bordeaux - Bordeaux – Mérignac Airport
Marseille - Marseille Provence Airport
Nice - Nice Côte d'Azur Airport

Germany
Leipzig/Halle - Leipzig/Halle Airport

Norway
Stavanger - Stavanger Airport, Sola

Poland
Gdańsk - Gdańsk Lech Wałęsa Airport
Katowice - Katowice International Airport

Spain
Vitoria - Vitoria Airport

Fleet
The Exin fleet includes the following aircraft (as of 1 September 2011):

4 Antonov An-26

Accidents and incidents

On 18 March 2010, Flight 3589, operated by Antonov An-26 SP-FDO received an unsafe gear warning on approach to Lennart Meri Tallinn Airport, Tallinn, Estonia on a flight from Helsinki Airport, Helsinki, Finland. A go-around was initiated, during which an engine failed and a wheels-up landing was made on the frozen surface of Lake Ülemiste. Two of the six crew were injured.

On 25 August 2010, Flight 3788, operated by Antonov An-26 SP-FDP rejected takeoff from Tallinn's runway 08 at high speed when the gear collapsed or retracted during the takeoff roll. The airplane skidded to a stop on its belly, no injuries occurred.

References

External links

Airlines of Poland
Airlines established in 1991
Cargo airlines
Polish companies established in 1991